Clyde Hendrick is a Horn Professor of Psychology at Texas Tech University. He received his doctorate degree from University of Missouri in 1967 in Psychology.

His main research interests include close relationships. During the past decade his primary focus has been around love and sex attitudes. In collaboration with doctoral students. Hendrick has studied various aspects related to love and sex attitudes. These two research areas are connected to close relations, such as relationship satisfaction, communication modalities, personality variables, conflict styles, and self-disclosure. He works very closely with Susan Hendrick on many of his research studies. As a second interest, Hendrick focuses on the writings of Charles S. Peirce. Together, they are known as "The Love Doctors".

Primary Interests:
 Love
 Sex Attitudes
 Close Relations
 Relationship Attitudes
 Communication Styles
 Personal Beliefs
 Gender Differences

Publications:
 Close Relationships: A Sourcebook
 Group Processes
 Romantic Love
 Research Methods in Personality and Social Psychology
 Perspectives on Social Psychology
 The Nature of Theory and Research in Social Psychology
 Sex and Gender

References

Living people
Texas Tech University faculty
Year of birth missing (living people)